is a Japanese novelist currently living in the Osaka Prefecture.

Biography 
Sumino started writing in high school. They initially submitted a story for the Dengeki Novel Prize, however after not making it past the first round of selection, Sumino revised their writing style before writing I Want to Eat Your Pancreas; the manuscript ended up being too long to be submitted for the prize.

They submitted the novel to the user-generated fiction website Shōsetsuka ni Narō in February 2014 under the pen name . They later officially debuted with the same work under Futabasha in 2015.

Works 

 (Illustrated by loundraw, published by Futabasha, June 2015, ISBN 978-4-575-23905-8)
 (Illustrated by loundraw, published by Futabasha, February 2016, ISBN 978-4-575-23945-4)
 (Published by Futabasha, December 2016, ISBN 978-4-575-24007-8)
 (Published by Shinchosha, March 2017, ISBN 978-4-10-350831-1)
 (Published by Kadokawa, March 2018, ISBN 978-4-04-105206-8)
 (Published by Gentosha, March 2019, ISBN 978-4-344-03435-8)
 (Published by Gentosha, February 2021, ISBN 978-4-344-03756-4)
 (Published by Shinchosha, September 2020, ISBN 978-4-10-350832-8)

References

External links 
 Yoru Sumino on Shōsetsuka ni Narō 

Living people
Japanese novelists
Light novelists
Year of birth missing (living people)